Experimental Safety Vehicle (ESV) is the designation for experimental concept cars which are used to test car safety ideas.

In 1973, the U.S. DOT announced its ESV project, the aim of which was to obtain safer vehicles by 1981. A car produced by this effort was known as the Minicar RSV.

In 1991, the ESV abbreviation was backronymed to Enhanced Safety of Vehicles.

Some ESVs 
Aurora, a one-man effort 1957 ESV. 
Sir Vival, a safety car created by Walter C. Jerome in 1958 ESV. 
Austin Metro PSC1 (Pedestrian Safety Car One), 1985.
BLMC SSV -Safety Systems Vehicle- series.

SSV1 Based on the MGB GT (1972).
SRV2 Based on the Morris Marina (1974).
SRV3 Based on the BMC ADO 17 Austin 1800 badge engineered family.
SRV4 Based on the Mini.
SRV5 Based on the BMC ADO 16 Austin/Morris 1300, featuring an innovative spring-loaded pedestrian-catching bar.
Chrysler RSV -Research Safety Vehicle-  based on the Simca 1307.
Datsun ESV (1973), based on the Nissan Bluebird.
Fiat ESV 1500 libbre, 2000 libbre and 2500 libbre (libbre meaning pounds in Italian) (1971).

Mercedes-Benz ESV24 (1974).
Mercedes-Benz ESF 2009 Experimental Safety Vehicle.
Nissan 216X (1971).
Pininfarina PF Sigma (1963).
Pininfarina Sigma (1969), a Formula One ESV.
Pininfarina Nido (2004), featuring a sled-mounted survival cell with interior crumple zones.
Renault BRV -Basic Research Vehicle- (1974).
Renault Epure, based on the Renault 5 (1979).

Toyota ESV (1972-1973)

Volvo VESC (1972).
Volvo SCC (2001).
Volkswagen ESVW1 (1972)  . (link dead)

References

External links 
 NHTSA Page of ESV Conference Proceedings, 1998 (16th) to  2015 (24th)
 Collection of technical PDFs about ESVs including Proceedings from several older ESV Conferences.

Concept cars
Automotive safety
Experimental vehicles